is a former Japanese football player.

Playing career
Kobayashi was born in Sano on April 13, 1978. After graduating from high school, he joined the Japan Football League club Tokyo Gas (later FC Tokyo) in 1997. During the first season, he played in all matches and was selected for the Best Young Player award. The club was promoted to the J2 League in 1999 and the J1 League in 2000. He played often as left midfielder for a long time.  After he was in a motorcycle and broke his right leg in April 2002, he did not play as much. In 2006, he moved to the J2 club Sagan Tosu. In 2007, he moved to his local club Tochigi SC in the Japan Football League. He played often over two seasons and the club was promoted to J2 in 2009. However, he retired at the end of the 2008 season without playing in the J2 league.

Club statistics

References

External links

FC Tokyo

1978 births
Living people
Association football people from Tochigi Prefecture
Japanese footballers
J1 League players
J2 League players
Japan Football League (1992–1998) players
Japan Football League players
FC Tokyo players
Sagan Tosu players
Tochigi SC players
Association football midfielders